Benjamin Hennequin (born August 24, 1984) is a French weightlifter who competes in the -85 kg category. At the 2011 World Championships, he won a silver medal, with a total of 378 kg. At the 2014 European Championships, he won the bronze medal, with a total of 367 kg. He competed at the 2016 Olympics.

References

External links 
 
 

1984 births
Living people
French male weightlifters
Weightlifters at the 2008 Summer Olympics
Olympic weightlifters of France
Weightlifters at the 2012 Summer Olympics
Weightlifters at the 2016 Summer Olympics
World Weightlifting Championships medalists
Sportspeople from Bordeaux
Mediterranean Games gold medalists for France
Mediterranean Games medalists in weightlifting
Competitors at the 2009 Mediterranean Games
European Weightlifting Championships medalists
21st-century French people